Andrew Eleftheriou (born 8 November 1997) is an English professional footballer who last played as a defender for Wealdstone. He came through the youth system at Watford, making one Premier League appearance in 2017, and subsequently played on loan for Sandefjord and Braintree Town before his release in 2019.

Eleftheriou was born in England, and is of Cypriot descent.

Club career
Eleftheriou made his senior debut for Watford in a 5–0 home defeat against Manchester City on the last day of the 2016–17 Premier League season, coming on as a 39th-minute substitute for Daryl Janmaat.

On 27 March 2018, Eleftheriou joined Norwegian Eliteserien side Sandefjord on loan until 19 July. He made four league appearances and on 2 July returned to Watford to commence pre-season training.

Eleftheriou joined National League side Braintree Town on loan on 4 January 2019 until the end of the 2018–19 season. He played 18 times for the club as they were relegated from the division and was released by Watford in May 2019.

On 2 July 2019, Eleftheriou joined National League side Dagenham & Redbridge on a one-year contract. He was released by Dagenham along with five others in June 2021 following the expiration of his contract.

On 30 June 2021, Eleftheriou signed for Wealdstone. He made his debut on 21 August, against Woking, getting an assist in a 2-1 defeat. Eleftheriou made 12 appearances in total before an injury in November ruled him out for the season. On 17 May 2022, it was announced that Eleftheriou had been released by the club.

Career statistics

References

External links
Soccerbase

1997 births
Living people
Footballers from Islington (district)
English footballers
English people of Greek Cypriot descent
Association football defenders
Watford F.C. players
Braintree Town F.C. players
Dagenham & Redbridge F.C. players
Wealdstone F.C. players
Premier League players
Eliteserien players
National League (English football) players
English expatriate sportspeople in Norway
English expatriate footballers
Expatriate footballers in Norway